Passport to Pimlico is a 1949 British comedy film made by Ealing Studios and starring Stanley Holloway, Margaret Rutherford and Hermione Baddeley. It was directed by Henry Cornelius and written by T. E. B. Clarke. The story concerns the unearthing of treasure and documents that lead to a small part of Pimlico to be declared a legal part of the House of Burgundy, and therefore exempt from the post-war rationing or other bureaucratic restrictions active in Britain at the time.

Passport to Pimlico explores the spirit and unity of wartime London in a post-war context and offers an examination of the English character. Like other Ealing comedies, the film pits a small group of British against a series of changes to the status quo from an external agent. The story was an original concept by the screenwriter T. E. B. Clarke. He was inspired by an incident during the Second World War, when the maternity ward of Ottawa Civic Hospital was temporarily declared extraterritorial by the Canadian government so that when Princess Juliana of the Netherlands gave birth, the baby was born on Dutch territory, and would not lose her right to the throne.

Passport to Pimlico was well-received on its release. The film was released in the same year as Whisky Galore! and Kind Hearts and Coronets, leading to 1949 being remembered as one of the peak years of the Ealing comedies. Passport to Pimlico was nominated for the British Academy Film Award for Best British Film and the Academy Award for Writing (Story and Screenplay). There have since been two BBC Radio adaptations: the first in 1952, the second in 1996.

Plot
The film's opening credits end with the words "dedicated to the memory of", with an image of Second World War British food and clothing ration coupons.

In post-Second World War London, an unexploded bomb detonates in Miramont Gardens, Pimlico. The explosion reveals a long-buried cellar containing artwork, coins, jewellery and an ancient manuscript. The document is authenticated by the historian Professor Hatton-Jones as a royal charter of Edward IV that ceded a house and its estates to Charles, the last Duke of Burgundy, when he sought refuge there after being presumed dead at the 1477 Battle of Nancy. As the charter had never been revoked, an area of Pimlico is declared to still be a legal part of Burgundy.

As the British government has no legal jurisdiction, it requires the local residents to form a representative committee according to the laws of the long-defunct dukedom before negotiating with them. Ancient Burgundian law requires that the duke himself appoint a council. Sébastien de Charolais arrives and presents his claim to the title, which is verified by Professor Hatton-Jones. He forms the governing body, which includes Spiller, the local policeman; Mr. Wix, the manager of the bank branch; and Arthur Pemberton, a neighbourhood shopkeeper, who is appointed as Burgundy's prime minister. The council begin discussions with the government, particularly about the Burgundian treasure.

After it dawns on people that Burgundy is not subject to post-war rationing or other bureaucratic restrictions, the district is quickly flooded with black marketeers and shoppers. Spiller is unable to handle the rising tide of problems by himself. In response, the British authorities surround the Burgundian territory with barbed wire. The residents retaliate against what they see as heavy-handed bureaucratic action; they stop a London Underground train as it passes through Burgundy, and ask to see passports of all passengers: those without documents are prevented from proceeding.

The British government retaliates by breaking off negotiations and isolating Burgundy. The residents are invited to "emigrate" to England, but few leave. Power, water and deliveries of food are all cut off at the border by the British. Late one night, the Burgundians covertly connect a hose to a nearby British water main and fill a bomb crater, solving the water problem, but this floods the food store. Unable to overcome this new problem, the Burgundians prepare to give up. Sympathetic Londoners begin to throw food parcels across the barrier, and soon others join in; the Burgundians have an ample supply, and decide to stay. A helicopter pumps milk through a hose and pigs are parachuted into the area.

Meanwhile, the British government comes under public pressure to resolve the situation. It becomes clear to the British diplomats assigned to find a solution that defeating the Burgundians through starvation is both difficult and unpopular with the British people, so they negotiate. The sticking point turns out to be the disposition of the unearthed treasure. Wix, now the Burgundian chancellor of the exchequer, suggests a Burgundian loan of the treasure to Britain. With the final piece of the deadlock eliminated, Burgundy reunites with Britain, which also sees the return of rationing for food and clothing to the area. The celebratory outdoor banquet is interrupted by heavy rain.

Cast

Themes
Passport to Pimlico contains numerous references to the Second World War and the postwar Labour Government to accentuate the spirit within the small Burgundian enclave. The scholar of film studies, Charles Barr, in his examination of the Ealing films, observes that in opposing the British government, the Burgundians "recover the spirit, the resilience and local autonomy and unity of wartime London". Barr suggests the actions "re-enact, ... in miniature, the war experience of Britain itself". The film historian Mark Duguid, writing for the British Film Institute, considers that the opposition is a "yearning nostalgia for the social unity of the war years". 

The film historians Anthony Aldgate and Jeffrey Richards describe Passport to Pimlico as a progressive comedy because it upsets the established social order to promote the well-being of a community. The view of the community put forward in the film has been criticised as being anachronistic, as the wartime unity had already passed by 1949. According to Aldgate and Richards, the welcome return to the ration books at the end of the film signifies an acceptance that the measures of the British government are in the best interests of the people.

The device of pitting a small group of British against a series of changes to the status quo from an external agent leads the British Film Institute to consider Passport to Pimlico, along with other of the Ealing comedies, as "conservative, but 'mildly anarchic' daydreams, fantasies". At the close of the story, when the summer heatwave turns to a torrential downpour, the film has "something of the quality of a fever-dream", according to Aldgate and Richards.

According to the film historian Robert Sellers, Passport to Pimlico "captures the most quintessential English traits of individualism, tolerance and compromise"; Duguid sees the examination of the English character as being "at the heart" of the film. This was one of the aspects that appealed to Margaret Rutherford, who liked the way the British were portrayed "accentuating their individuality and decency, while acknowledging some parochial idiosyncracies".

Production
Passport to Pimlico was produced by Michael Balcon, the head of Ealing Studios; he appointed Henry Cornelius as director. The film was one of three comedies to be produced simultaneously, alongside Whisky Galore! and Kind Hearts and Coronets; all three were released into UK cinemas over two months.

The plot was an original story by T. E. B. Clarke, a writer of both comedy and drama scripts for Ealing; his other screenplays for the studio include Hue and Cry (1947), Against the Wind (1948), The Blue Lamp (1950), The Lavender Hill Mob (1951) and The Titfield Thunderbolt (1953). Clarke was inspired by an incident during the Second World War, when the maternity ward of Ottawa Civic Hospital was temporarily declared extraterritorial by the Canadian government so that when the then-Princess Juliana of the Netherlands gave birth to Princess Margriet of the Netherlands, the baby was born on Dutch territory, and would not lose her right to the throne. The airlift of food supplies into the Burgundian enclave was influenced by the flights of food and supplies during the Berlin Blockade of June 1948 – May 1949. The music for the film was composed by Georges Auric, who had been involved in several other productions for Ealing Studios.

The lead part of Pemberton was initially offered to Jack Warner. He turned down the role because he was committed to another film, and so the part was instead offered to Stanley Holloway. Alastair Sim was offered the role of Professor Hatton-Jones, but after he turned it down, Margaret Rutherford was cast instead.

Filming
Passport to Pimlico is set during a heatwave that occurred in Britain in 1947, but, despite this, filming took place during 1948's abnormally wet summer. The poor weather caused delays in production, which led to the film being over-time and over-budget. Shooting started early each day, in an attempt to get the first successful shot completed before 9:00 am. An average of ten takes a day were taken, in an attempt to get two and a half minutes of usable film per day. There were arguments between Cornelius and Balcon throughout the production, because Balcon was unhappy with what he saw as poor direction. Cornelius left Ealing Studios after working on Passport to Pimlico and did not work for the studio again.

The outdoor scenes were not shot in Pimlico, but about a mile away in Lambeth. A set was built on a large Second World War bombsite just south of the Lambeth Road at the junction of Hercules Road. At the conclusion of filming, the site had to be returned to the same bomb-damaged state as before, to enable the locals to claim war damage compensation. The site has since been built on, and now features 1960s municipal flats.

Release and reception
Passport to Pimlico was released into UK cinemas on 28 April 1949; the film was financially successful. For the US release on 23 October 1949, soil was imported and placed in front of the cinema; commissionaires in the uniform of a British policeman would hand out mock passports and invite passers-by to step onto English soil to see the film. The film was shown at the 1949 Cannes Film Festival, although it was not entered into the competition.

Critics warmly praised Passport to Pimlico on its release. Several critics identified that the script was excellent, and the reviewer for The Manchester Guardian thought that "the chief credit for ... [this] joy of a film should go to T. E. B. Clarke". The unnamed reviewer for The Monthly Film Bulletin considered that "every line, every 'gag', is a little masterpiece of wit", while the critic C. A. Lejeune, writing for The Observer, thought that the writing and direction were excellent; she went on to record that "the end comes too soon, which is something that can be said of very few films".

The acting was also praised by many of the critics; Lejeune thought that "the acting of the countless small character parts that the plot brings together is splendid", while the reviewer for The Monthly Film Bulletin considered that "each character, and indeed every individual member of the lengthy cast, provides a gem of comedy acting at its highest and best". The Manchester Guardian reviewer was critical about aspects of the direction which, it was said, was undertaken "with barely sufficient skill to sustain the fun". The critic Henry Raynor, writing for Sight and Sound, thought that the film "sacrificed a comic enquiry into motives and personality to a farcical romp ... It was carried through, not by wit or polish, but by a sometimes hysterical jollity".

Passport to Pimlico was nominated for the British Academy Film Award for Best British Film, alongside Whisky Galore! and Kind Hearts and Coronets, although they lost to The Third Man (1949); the film was also nominated for the Academy Award for Writing (Story and Screenplay), where it lost to Battleground (1949).

Adaptations
In 1952, a radio adaptation, written by Charles Hatton, was broadcast on the BBC's Light Programme. Charles Leno played Pemberton, in a cast that included Christopher Lee, Gladys Henson and Kenneth Williams. A BBC Radio 4 adaptation, written by John Peacock, was broadcast on 20 January 1996. George Cole played the part of Pemberton; Michael Maloney and Joan Sims also appeared.

The 1993 film Wayne's World 2 was originally planned to be a remake of Passport to Pimlico, but shortly before filming was to begin, executives at Paramount Pictures realized that the studio had not acquired rights to the earlier film and ordered writer/star Mike Myers to write a new screenplay with a different plot.

See also
 The Little Switzerland, a 2019 Spanish comedy film partially based on this film
 Frestonia, the name of the "republic" adopted by the residents of Freston Road, London, when they attempted to secede from the United Kingdom in 1977
 Micronations
 BFI Top 100 British films

Notes

References

Sources

Further reading

External links
 
 Passport to Pimlico at the British Film Institute
 Passport to Pimlico at the BFI's Screenonline

1949 comedy films
Cultural depictions of Metropolitan Police officers
1949 films
British comedy films
Films set in London
Films set on the London Underground
Films shot in London
Films directed by Henry Cornelius
Films produced by Michael Balcon
Films with screenplays by T. E. B. Clarke
Films scored by Georges Auric
Ealing Studios films
Duchy of Burgundy
Pimlico
Cultural depictions of Charles the Bold
British black-and-white films
Pimlico
1940s British films